Inez from Hollywood is a 1924 American silent drama film directed by Alfred E. Green. It was produced by Sam E. Rork with distribution through First National Pictures. The film is based on the short story The Worst Woman in Hollywood by Adela Rogers St. Johns. It stars Anna Q. Nilsson, Lewis Stone, and 18-year-old Mary Astor.

Cast

Preservation
With no prints of Inez from Hollywood located in any film archives, it is a lost film.

References

External links

Newspaper advertisement

1924 films
American silent feature films
Lost American films
Films directed by Alfred E. Green
Films based on short fiction
1924 drama films
Silent American drama films
Films set in California
American black-and-white films
Films based on works by Adela Rogers St. Johns
1924 lost films
Lost drama films
1920s American films